Getap, known until 1946 as Karakula or Gharaghla is a village in the Aragatsavan Municipality of the Aragatsotn Province of Armenia, located near the Armenia–Turkey border.

References 

Report of the results of the 2001 Armenian Census

Populated places in Aragatsotn Province
Yazidi populated places in Armenia